Alfonso d'Avalos d'Aquino, 6th Marquis of Pescara, 2nd Marquis of Vasto (1502 – 31 March 1546), was an Italian condottiero of Aragonese origins, renowned for his service in favor of Charles V, Holy Roman Emperor and King of Spain.

Biography
He was born in Ischia, the cousin of Francesco Ferdinando I d'Ávalos, inheriting his titles after 1525, fighting the French and the Venetians by his side. He fought at the Battle of Pavia (1525). During the period 1526-1528 he fought under Hugo of Moncada, being captured on 28 April 1528 by the Genoese captain Filippino Doria at the Capo d'Orso.

In July  1535 he served as Imperial lieutenant during the reconquest of the city of Tunis in North Africa. The failure on the third war against France trying to invade  Provence, and the death of the first Governor of the Duchy of Milan, Antonio de Leyva, prompted him in 1538 to accept the nomination as governor, replacing Marino Caracciolo, the second governor, becoming some sort of protector of literary and musical people . Wars with French and North Italians ended for a while with the Treaty of Crespy (1544). He also became a Knight in the Order of the Golden Fleece.
            
He later represented Emperor Charles V as an ambassador, in 1538, on the succession to the new Doge of the Republic of Venice, Pietro Lando.

He commanded the Imperial army in Italy during the Italian War of 1542 and was defeated by the French at the Battle of Ceresole. However, in the Battle of Serravalle on 2 June 1544, an aftermath of the Italian War of 1542, he managed to defeat a force of freshly raised Italian mercenaries in French service, commanded by Pietro Strozzi and Giovanni Francesco Orsini, count of Pitigliano.

He married in 1523 Maria d'Aragona and by her had 5 children:
 Innico d'Avalos d'Aragona, (1536–1600), an Italian Cardinal.
 Francesco Ferdinando d'Ávalos (1537–1571), commander in chief of the Spanish army in Lombardy and Piedmont.
 Donna Antonia d'Avalos (1538–1567)
 Cesare d'Avalos (1536–1614)
 Beatrice d'Avalos (1533-1558)

References

Gran Enciclopedia de España, 22 volumes, 11,052 pages, (1991), vol 3, page 1,109 

1502 births
1546 deaths
People from the Province of Naples
16th-century condottieri
Military leaders of the Italian Wars
Alfonso
Generals of the Holy Roman Empire